Ethinylestradiol benzoate, or 17α-ethynylestradiol 3-benzoate, is a synthetic estrogen and estrogen ester – specifically, the C3 benzoate ester of ethinylestradiol – which was first described in the late 1930s and was never marketed.

See also
 List of estrogen esters § Esters of other steroidal estrogens

References

Abandoned drugs
Ethynyl compounds
Benzoate esters
Tertiary alcohols
Estranes
Estrogen esters
Prodrugs
Synthetic estrogens